Kowsareh (also Romanized as Kowsāreh and Kows̄areh; also known as Kows̄ar and Kowshareh) is a village in Tolbozan Rural District, Golgir District, Masjed Soleyman County, Khuzestan Province, Iran. At the 2006 census, its population was 109, in 19 families.

References 

Populated places in Masjed Soleyman County